Damen is a under construction rapid transit station on the Chicago "L"'s Green Line that is planned to open in 2024. A station existed at this location from 1893 to 1948; opened as Robey in 1893, it was one of the original stations on what was then known as the Lake Street Elevated. The removal of the old station created a  gap between the remaining stations. As the surrounding neighborhood gentrified, the need for a replacement station grew. The station will also provide closer access to the United Center sports arena.

History

Original station (1893–1948)
The Lake Street Elevated Railway Company was incorporated on February 7, 1888. Reincorpoated as the Lake Street Elevated Railroad Company on August 24, 1892, to avoid legal issues, its line, the Lake Street Elevated, commenced revenue operations at 5 a.m. on November 6, 1893, between California station and the Market Street Terminal. The new line had 13 stations, one of which was located on Robey Street; the street, originally named for politician James Robey, was renamed Damen Avenue for Father Arnold Damen in 1927. Originally powered by steam locomotives, the Elevated's tracks were electrified on May 9, 1896.

The Lake Street Elevated Railroad, having been dogged by financial issues since its inception, was reorganized as the Chicago and Oak Park Elevated Railroad (C&OP) on March 31, 1904. The C&OP, along with the other companies operating "L" lines in Chicago, became a part of the Chicago Elevated Railways (CER) trust on July 1, 1911. CER acted as a de facto holding company for the "L"unifying its operations, instituting the same management across the companies, and instituting free transfers between the lines starting in 1913but kept the underlying companies intact. This continued until the companies were formally merged into the single Chicago Rapid Transit Company (CRT) in 1924, which assumed operations on January 9; the former C&OP would not join the CRT until it was bought out at an auction on January 31, and was designated the Lake Street Division of the CRT for administrative purposes. Although municipal ownership of transit had been a hotly-contested issue for half a century, the publicly-owned Chicago Transit Authority (CTA) would not be created until 1945, or assume operation of the "L" until October 1, 1947.

The newly-created CTA closed the original Damen station alongside nine others on the Lake Street Elevated on April 4, 1948, due to their low ridership and to speed up service along the line. The closed stations were demolished in early 1949 and adaptively reused to make improvements to other "L" stations, including their wood and steel platform girders used to extend station platforms elsewhere.

New station  
The CTA conducted a study in 2002 to investigate the possibility of "infill stations" on the Green Line to fill station gaps that were wider than normal. Morgan, another Lake Street station closed in 1948, had been floated for revival since the 1990s and was discussed in the study, opening in 2012 and filling a  gap between Ashland and Clinton. Another infill station discussed by the study, Cermak–McCormick Place station, was completed in 2015. Both stations spurred significant economic growth in their respective neighborhoods.

The new Damen station was announced on February 9, 2017, marking the third new CTA station announced during Rahm Emanuel's tenure as Mayor of Chicago. At the time of the announcement, design and engineering was planned to commence in 2017, construction of the new station was expected to begin in spring 2019 and be completed in 2020. Groundbreaking of the new station began in May 2019, with construction of the new station to begin in late 2019 and is expected to be completed in 2021. It will fill the  distance between the California and Ashland stations on the Green line. It will become the closest "L" station to the United Center, with public transportation service to an emerging business corridor and residential neighborhood. At the time of the announcement, the estimate cost was $50 million, but no designs for the station were announced. State and federal agencies were being lobbied  for funding for the station by 27th ward alderman Walter Burnett Jr. although tax increment financing(TIF) was planned if no other funding is received.

On April 25, 2018, the city began the Lake Street reconstruction project, which includes the Damen Station.

On August 12, 2022, after years of delay, a building permit for the new Damen Station was issued, with the construction expected to take 18 months. Causes for the delays included supply chain issues that hampered utility relocation.

Station details

Original station

The original Damen station had two station houses, one on each platform, designed in a "gingerbread" Queen Anne style, similar to the other stations on the route and the surviving station houses at Ashland. The station houses were heated by potbelly stoves, and while earlier plans had called for their ticket agent's booths to be placed on the sides of the station houses facing the street, they ended up being placed in alcoves adjacent to the platforms. The construction of the Lake Street Elevated's stations was contracted to Frank L. Underwood of Kansas City and Willard R. Green of New York, who subcontracted to the Lloyd and Pennington Company.

New station
On July 9, 2018, the design for the new station was revealed.  A glass-covered pedestrian bridge will enable foot traffic between the inbound and outbound platforms, and provide a view of the city's skyline.  The station was designed by the architecture firm Perkins and Will.

Ridership
The original Damen station's ridership peaked at 496,839 passengers in 1905, and last exceeded 400,000 riders in 1906. Ridership held steady for a decade afterwards, but last exceeded 300,000 passengers in 1920, 200,000 passengers in 1927, and 100,000 in 1931 before the late 1940s, bottoming out . In its last full year of operation, 1947, Damen served 106,902 riders, a 3.91 percent decrease from the 111,248 riders in 1946. For the part of 1948 it was open, Damen served 30,262 passengers. While in 1947 it had been the Lake Street's tenth-lowest ridership station, in early 1948 it declined to be its fifth-least patronized station, after the overflow-use Randolph/Market station downtown, Campbell and Oakley immediately to Damen's west, and Racine, all of which also closed on April 4. In 1947, it was the 208th-most ridden of the 222 "L" stations where ridership was recorded, and during early 1948 was the 218th-busiest of 223 such stations.

Notes

References

Works cited

CTA Green Line stations
Proposed Chicago "L" stations
Railway stations in the United States opened in 1893
Railway stations closed in 1948
Railway stations scheduled to open in 2024
1893 establishments in Illinois
1948 disestablishments in Illinois
Buildings and structures under construction in the United States